The Halaypotra are a Muslim community found in the state of Gujarat in India and a province of Sindh in Pakistan. They are one of a number of communities of Maldhari pastoral nomads found in the Banni region of Kutch.

History and origin

The Halaypotra claim descent from Halosamma, a nobleman belonging to the Samma Rajput tribe. Other traditions connect the Halaypotra with the Soomra tribe of Sindh. They are a small Maldhari community, concentrated in the Banni region of Kutch. The Halaypotra perceive themselves to be Muslim Rajputs.

Present circumstances

The community is concentrated in the talukas of Bhuj, Abdasa and Mandvi in Kutch District of Gujarat, and the neighbouring districts of Badin and Tharparkar in Sindh.  They speak a dialect of Kutchi, with substantial Sindhi loan words. The Halaypotra consists of seven clans, the main ones being the Sharman, Dera, Tajju and Babbia. They are an endogamous community, and marriages between the clans is the norm. The community are Sunni Muslims, as well as practicing folk beliefs.

The Halaypotra are pastoral Maldhari nomads, raising buffaloes, cows and sheep, and graze these in the Banni region. They also sell milk to Bhuj. They often migrate to Saurashtra with to graze their cattle. Like many other Kutchis, the Halaypotra have migrated to others parts of India in search of work. The community are also famed for their embroidery work, known as bharat ka kam.

See also
Samma
Sindhi Rajputs
Mutwa

References

Social groups of Gujarat
Social groups of Sindh
Tribes of Kutch
Maldhari communities
Muslim communities of India
Sindhi tribes

Sindhi tribes in India
Muslim communities of Gujarat